The World Golf Foundation (WGF)'s mission is to unite the golf industry around initiatives that promote, enhance the growth of and provide access to the game worldwide, while preserving golf’s traditional values and passing them on to others. It accomplishes its mission through three divisions it oversees:

•	World Golf Hall of Fame: celebrates golf and preserves the legacies of those who have made it great. 

•	First Tee is impacting the lives of young people by providing educational programs that build character and instill life-enhancing values through the game of golf.

•	WE ARE GOLF unites and activates the golf industry around key strategic initiatives that increase participation and retention of participants, inspire involvement and interest in the game, and promote sustainable best practices for golf facilities. 

The WGF's Board is composed of golf's major international organizations and professional Tours: the European Tour, LPGA, Masters Tournament, PGA of America, PGA TOUR, The R&A and the USGA

References

External links
 Official website

Golf associations
Sports organizations established in 1994